Hiroko Takahashi may refer to:

, Japanese cross-country skier
, better known as Ao Takahashi, Japanese voice actress
, better known as Kaoru Shimamura, Japanese voice actress